After the Ball is a play by Australian playwright David Williamson, published by Currency Press in 1997.  Williamson wrote the play in response to his mother's death.

Plot
The play is about Stephen, who has, with ill grace, returned home to his mother's deathbed. As he and his sister rake through the family photographs and childhood memories, they find conflicting versions of their parents’ unhappy marriage.

Background
The play was partly inspired by the death of Williamson's mother in 1995.

First Production
After the Ball was first produced by Queensland Theatre Company at the Suncorp Theatre, Brisbane, on 3 July 1997 with the following cast:
Kate Macrae (older):	Penny Everingham
Judy Macrae (older):	Jennifer Flowers
Stephen Macrae (older):	Bille Brown
Ron Macrae:	Max Gillies
Kate Macrae (younger):	Carol Burns
Judy Macrae (younger) / nurse:	Melissa McMahon
Stephen Macrae (younger):	Anthony Weigh
Claire Cummins:	Gael Ballantyne
Maureen Donahue:	Sally McKenzie
Director, Robyn Nevin
Designer, Bill Haycock
Lighting Designer, David Walters
Music, Max Lambert

References

External links

Plays by David Williamson
1997 plays